Nate Swift (born August 24, 1985) is a former American football player. Swift was born in Hutchinson, Minnesota, on August 24, 1985. He played wide receiver for the University of Nebraska, where he set a school record for career receptions (166) and finished second in season receiving yardage (941 in 2008), career receiving yardage (2,476), and season receptions (63 in 2008). He was signed as an undrafted free agent by the Denver Broncos on April 27, 2009, after the 2009 NFL Draft. Swift was released in September and signed with the Jacksonville Jaguars on November 17, 2009, to their practice squad.

References

External links
 Nebraska Cornhuskers biography

1985 births
Living people
American football wide receivers
Denver Broncos players
Jacksonville Jaguars players
Nebraska Cornhuskers football players
People from Hutchinson, Minnesota
Players of American football from Minnesota